Kaystros or Kestros was a town of ancient Cilicia and later of Isauria inhabited during Roman and Byzantine times. Its relationship with Cestrus, a titular bishopric, otherwise unlocated is not clear.

Its site is located near Kilisebeleni, Macar, in Asiatic Turkey.

References

Populated places in ancient Cilicia
Populated places in ancient Isauria
Former populated places in Turkey
Roman towns and cities in Turkey
Populated places of the Byzantine Empire
History of Antalya Province